Caamp (stylized as CAAMP) is an American folk band from Upper Arlington, Ohio.

History 
The band began as a project between childhood friends Taylor Meier and Evan Westfall, who met at a summer camp while they were middle school students. Meier and Westfall graduated from Upper Arlington High School in 2012. In 2013 Taylor began playing in coffee shops around Athens while studying at Ohio University. They later added bass player Matt Vinson and Joseph Kavalec on the keyboards.

To date, Caamp has released four albums. Their first album, self-titled, was released in 2016 on Square Roots Records. In 2018, Caamp released a six-song EP. Their second album, By and By, was released in 2019 under Mom + Pop Music. "Peach Fuzz" is a single on the album.

Caamp appeared as an act at the 2019 Mo Pop Festival in Detroit. They also appeared at the 2019 Austin City Limits Music Festival.

In August 2019, Caamp made their debut on the Billboard Emerging Artists chart. By and By debuted at number one on the Heatseekers Albums chart.

On June 24, 2022, the band released their third studio album, Lavender Days. The release of the album was preceded by three singles: "Believe", "Apple Tree Blues", and "Lavender Girl". Their song Apple Tree Blues was featured on Barack Obama’s summer playlist.

On February 18, 2022, Caamp collaborated with Paris Jackson on her the lost EP, on the song "Lost".

Discography

Albums

Singles

References

Musical groups from Ohio
Mom + Pop Music artists